Keys of the kingdom is a Christian concept of eternal church authority.

(The) Keys of the Kingdom may also refer to:

 Keys of the Kingdom, 1991 studio album by The Moody Blues
 The Keys of Heaven used in ecclesiastical heraldry
The Keys of the Kingdom, 1941 novel by A. J. Cronin
 The Keys of the Kingdom (film), 1944 film based on the Cronin novel

See also
 Keys to the Kingdom (disambiguation)